The flag of Democratic Kampuchea consisted of the golden Angkor Wat in the red background. It was adopted on 5 January 1976 during Khmer Rouge rule under Cambodia.  

This flag is similar to the flag of Vietnam. It was however, unusual among the communist state national flags without any symbolic red or gold star or hammer and sickle.

History
The flag of Democratic Kampuchea replaced the flag of the Khmer Republic, becoming the official flag of Cambodia on 5 January 1976 after the Khmer Rouge came to power in the country on 17 April 1975. During that period, it used the former Kingdom of Cambodia flag that was also flown in the United Nations headquarters from April 1975 to January 1976. It was abolished many times from provinces of Cambodia bordering Vietnam, but the country's new government counted the day of liberation of the capital city, 7 January 1979, as the official day in which it was abolished. 

Although the flag of the People's Republic of Kampuchea became the official flag within Cambodia after the ousting of the Khmer Rouge government, the flag of Democratic Kampuchea would still be used by the Coalition Government of Democratic Kampuchea and in the United Nations. Most states kept diplomatic ties with the Coalition Government of Democratic Kampuchea as the People's Republic of Kampuchea failed to gain widespread international recognition.

Symbolism 
Red represents revolution and blood and the Angkor Wat stands for state of the people, workers and peasants.

See also
List of Cambodian flags
Flag of Cambodia, Historical national flags

References

Democratic Kampuchea
Democratic Kampuchea
Kampuchea